Hjem (English: Home) is a Norwegian drama series that aired in 2012 and 2013 on NRK.

Its setting is the local community Vestfossen, where a father admits to his daughter that two other women in Vestfossen are her half-sisters. The three half-sisters are played by Jannike Kruse, Heidi Ruud Ellingsen and Kaia Varjord. The drama focuses on handling of smalltown secrets, and was NRK's next major feelgood drama production after Himmelblå.

At the premiere, the series was given a "die throw" of 4 in Aftenposten and in Bergens Tidende; and 3 in VG and in Dagbladet.

References

NRK original programming
2012 Norwegian television series debuts
2010s Norwegian television series
Norwegian television series